Page Bank is a village in County Durham, in England. It is situated on the north bank of the River Wear to the east of Willington and to the north-west of Spennymoor.

External links

External links

Villages in County Durham